Stuttaford is a surname. Notable people with the surname include:

Richard Stuttaford (1870–1945), South African businessman and politician
Thomas Stuttaford (1931–2018), British doctor, politician, author, medical columnist
Wally Stuttaford, Rhodesian/Zimbabwean politician
William Stuttaford (1928–1999), British stockbroker, businessman and political activist

English-language surnames
Surnames of English origin
Surnames of British Isles origin